The Seton Hall Pirates women's basketball team represents Seton Hall University in South Orange, New Jersey, United States. The school's team currently competes in the Big East where it has competed since the 1982–83 season.  Under coach Sue Dilley, the women’s basketball team began competing in 1973-74, obtaining a 9-4 record and its first winning season.  The Pirates are currently coached by Anthony Bozzella.

Yearly records

Postseason

NCAA Division I

AIAW College Division/Division II
The Pirates made two appearances in the AIAW National Division II basketball tournament, with a combined record of 1–2.

References

External links
 Official website